Long Point is a peninsula located in Provincetown, Massachusetts, at the extreme tip of Cape Cod, as it curls back in on itself to create Provincetown Harbor.  The Long Point Light was built on this point in 1827.  The lighthouse once shared this peninsula with a settlement of fishermen that came to be known as Long Point, Massachusetts.  This Provincetown village grew and thrived from 1818 until the late 1850s.   When the settlers decided to leave Long Point, they took most of their houses with them – about 30 structures in all – by floating them across the harbor.

During the American Civil War, the military established a defensive coastal artillery post and garrison at this location. The Long Point Battery came to be known as "Fort Useless" and "Fort Ridiculous" among the local residents.

Today, nothing remains of the village of Long Point, except for the lighthouse and an earthen mound, the last remnant from the earlier military post.

Early history
A fisherman named John Atwood built the first house on Long Point in 1818. He was followed by Prince Freeman, and next by Eldridge Smith.  Others soon followed in increasing numbers, and in 1822, Prince Freeman, Jr. became the first child born on "The Point", as it was called by the locals.

The initial lure that attracted so many fishermen to this area was its proximity to prime fishing grounds, and the amount of fish that could be caught from the shore.  Using sweep seines (that were hand-knit by their wives), fishermen caught an abundance of mackerel, shad and bass from shore. There are reports of up to seventy-five  barrels of white shad caught in one haul, fetching $16 per barrel – accounting for inflation, that single haul netted roughly $ in today's dollars.
 
By an act of Congress on May 18, 1826, the government earmarked $2,500 (roughly $ today) to acquire four acres at the extreme tip of the point, and to construct a lighthouse, which was completed in 1827.  By 1830, the lighthouse became the site of Long Point's first school, starting with only three children.  The Long Point community continued to grow, and by 1846, the Town of Provincetown voted to build a schoolhouse on Long Point.  By then, the village was home to 38 fishing families, with nearly 200 adults and 60 children.  In describing the experience of living on Long Point in the early 1800s, one author wrote:

With low costs and an endless supply of raw materials, the collection of sea salt was extremely profitable in the first part of the 19th century. Not only was salt shipped out for domestic consumption, but it was also used to supply the fishing industry, which dried and salted the catch to preserve the fish for shipment.

Challenges
Production of salt did not retain its lucrative luster for long, however, for downward price pressures had hit that industry from several angles. For one, the completion of the Erie Canal in 1830 meant a sharp increase in competition from companies that were mining massive salt deposits in Syracuse, New York.  Local competition had increased as well – by 1837, Provincetown had 78 saltworks, and the selling price had fallen from a high of eight dollars per bushel at the turn of the nineteenth century, down to only one dollar. Around that same time, demand for salt-cured fish began to decline, yielding to a growing consumer preference for ice harvesting and storage.  John Atwood Jr., the son of Long Point's founder, boasted that "In 1848 I brought the first mackerel ever received on ice to Boston. It was August. I took them in the sloop smack American Eagle."  He later pioneered the use of a jib topsail to shorten his time-to-market, so as to meet the growing appetite for fresh-caught fish.

 
Living on Long Point presented its own share of challenges as well. The geography of Provincetown as a whole made for an isolating existence throughout most of its history, as the town was essentially cut off, not just from the mainland, but in many ways, even from neighboring towns on Cape Cod.  The town was surrounded by water in every direction:
 Atlantic Ocean, to the north
 Massachusetts Bay to the northwest
 Cape Cod Bay to the west and southwest
 Provincetown Harbor to the south and southeast
 East Harbor and a salt marsh to the east

Until late in the 19th century, there was not a single road leading in or out of Provincetown – the only way to travel by land to the rest of Cape Cod was to first head north, traversing a series of tall, rolling sand dunes, and to then follow the thin strip of beach along the northern shore line, known as the "backshore".  A wooden bridge was erected over the East Harbor in 1854, only to be destroyed by a winter storm and ice two years later.  Although the bridge was replaced the following year, a traveler using it still had to traverse several miles over a sand route, which, together with the backshore route, would occasionally be washed out by storms.  Prior to the railroad's arrival in 1873, Provincetown was like an island, in that it relied almost entirely upon the sea for its communication, travel, and commerce needs.  All of this was doubly true of Long Point, being isolated from its own nearest neighbor, the rest of the town of Provincetown.  To reach the closest edge of town from Long Point by land, one had to make a difficult trek across a  beach route past Wood End to Herring Cove, and then another mile over continuously shifting sand dunes.  To complicate matters, portions of that route were underwater twice each day with the high tide.
 
Although salt was plentiful, there was no source of fresh water on Long Point.  Plank cisterns were built throughout the village to collect and store rain water for daily use.  During periods of drought, barrels of water had to be filled up in Provincetown, and then transported over to the point.

Beyond the challenges imposed by the occasional drought, however, the residents of Long Point came to recognize the potential for a much greater natural force – one that threatened to impact them with little advance warning.  While Long Point provides a natural barrier to protect Provincetown and its harbor from many storm hazards, the point bears the brunt of such a storm when it does so:

Moving
Sources differ and remain unclear as to the specific reasons for leaving Long Point; it is also unclear whether there was a triggering event which caused a wholesale departure, or whether there was instead a more orderly migration.  Sources all agree, however, that beginning in the 1850s, families began to leave Long Point and return to the main town.  Most of the families took their houses with them when they left Long Point – the local Deacon's specialty was moving buildings, and the houses, about 30 in all, were placed on rafts and floated across Provincetown Harbor to the town's West End.  "They say that so gently were these houses eased off that the moving didn't interfere with the housewife cooking her dinner," wrote Mary Heaton Vorse.  By the time of the American Civil War (1861–1865), only two houses were left on Long Point.

A 1942 article in the Cape Cod Standard Times tells the following variation of the story:

Many of those historic "floater homes", as they came to be called, are still standing in Provincetown's West End, and can be identified by a distinctive blue and white plaque that indicates the home's historic journey.  The schoolhouse was among the last buildings to leave Long Point; it was moved to Commercial Street in the center of town.

Long Point Battery 
During the War of 1812, the British navy had controlled Provincetown Harbor. Seeking to correct the lack of fortifications, the U.S. Army surveyed the harbor from 1833–1835, and noted that "the point had a large civilian population".  The Army returned to build the planned Long Point Battery during the American Civil War. Army documents state that:

The batteries were designed by and built under the supervision of Major Charles E. Blunt of the United States Army Corps of Engineers. The Army, however, did not actually "construct" the officer's quarters – instead, the company's three officers were headquartered in the last remaining house from the earlier village.  On March 5, 1864, the Commonwealth of Massachusetts ceded "an indefinite area (approximately 150 acres)" of Long Point to the United States Government.  The new barracks housed a company of 98 enlisted soldiers from the Unattached Companies of Massachusetts Volunteer Militia.  The 12th Unattached Company, which had been detached from an existing regiment of the Massachusetts Militia, at first served a 90-day tour of duty at the post from May through August 1864.  Most of the men reenlisted for another 100-day tour, this time as the 21st Unattached Company from August through November.  In November 1864, they enlisted once again for a full year, but they were mustered out at the end of June 1865, as the war had come to an end. The enlisted barracks was floated across the harbor postwar, and still exists as 473 Commercial Street in Provincetown.

The batteries on Long Point remained operational until the post was abandoned in 1872, but they were never used in combat.  In the years following the war, the people of Provincetown, aware that they were protected against an enemy that would never materialize, soon labelled the batteries "Fort Useless" and "Fort Ridiculous". The earthworks of the batteries remain, eroded down to sand dunes.

Late 19th century to present 

In 1873, a lighthouse inspection revealed that the original wooden light – whose unique architectural design came to be known as a "Cape Cod style lighthouse" – had deteriorated to such a poor condition that it might be destroyed by a strong storm.  In 1875, that light was replaced with the brick tower that stands today.

Even though the Army had moved out, they retained title to the land.  Nevertheless, at around the same time that the lighthouse was rebuilt, the Cape Cod Oil Works built a cod fish oil and whale oil factory in the area that had been the barracks.  As the land was still a military reservation, the Army tried to have the factory removed a number of times in the ensuing years.  Records from this period are scarce, but Army archives indicate that the factory was still operating in the middle of 1883 –  another source from 1890 states that "John Atwood built a wharf on the north side of the point, which is standing to-day, used by the Cape Cod Oil Works, the only buildings now left excepting the lighthouse."  The exact date of the factory's closing is unknown, but official Army correspondence in 1917 makes no mention of it. The only known photograph of the factory, taken in 1891 and retrieved from the National Archives and Records Administration is inscribed with the words "Condemned ... 1919".

An oil house was built in 1904, in order to properly store the flammable materials used to illuminate the light.  Aside from the lighthouse and the oil house, no other structure has survived to the present day.  The mound of earth that formed the foundation of the outer battery appears as none other than a sand dune – no other hint of the early settlement, the military post, nor the oil factory can be found on Long Point today.

One cultural artifact that is now visible atop the earthworks of the outer battery is a cross that honors the memory of Staff Sgt. Charles Darby – "an unsung soldier who loved the dunes". Darby was killed in action over the Netherlands in 1944.

Village detail, 1857 
The image below shows the layout of the houses, stores and saltworks on Long Point as they existed in 1857.  Clicking the image will lead not only to a larger image, but also to a legend key to the numbers.  That list, which includes the names of each home/store owner, gives one a good sense of the extent of the community at that time.

Gallery

See also
 List of military installations in Massachusetts

References

External links
 Aerial drone view of Long Point on YouTube

1818 establishments in Massachusetts
Cape Cod National Seashore
Ghost towns in Massachusetts
History of Barnstable County, Massachusetts
Landforms of Barnstable County, Massachusetts
Peninsulas of Massachusetts
Populated coastal places in Massachusetts
Populated places established in 1818
Provincetown, Massachusetts
Villages in Barnstable County, Massachusetts
Villages in Massachusetts